Uffe Ellemann-Jensen (1 November 1941 – 18 June 2022) was a Danish politician who served as Minister for Foreign Affairs of Denmark in the Conservative-led Poul Schlüter Administration from 1982 to 1993. He was leader of the Danish Liberal Party Venstre from 1984 to 1998 and President of the European Liberals 1995–2000.

In 1998 Ellemann-Jensen founded Baltic Development Forum, a non-profit networking organisation dedicated to the business development of the Baltic Sea region. He was its first chairman from its founding to 2011, and was also honorary chairman following his resignation. He was also non-executive director of various boards of international companies.

Political career 

A strong supporter of NATO and the European Union based upon his belief in Western cohesion, Ellemann-Jensen's stance led to many political battles with the left-wing opposition. Several times the opposition tried to topple him on issues of solidarity within NATO, but he survived. Uffe Ellemann-Jensen succeeded in convincing a majority in the Danish Parliament, the Folketinget, to actively support the U.S. led coalition against Iraq during the Gulf War. Furthermore, he led the Danish recognition of the renewed independence of the three Baltic countries in 1991, when Denmark was the first country to re-establish diplomatic relations with the three countries.
In 1992, Ellemann-Jensen, together with his German colleague Hans-Dietrich Genscher, took the initiative to create the Council of the Baltic Sea States (CBSS) and the EuroFaculty.

In September 1992, Ellemann-Jensen and other senior officials visited southern Somalia, one of the first foreign delegations to do so since the start of civil war there the year before.

After the fall of the centre-right government, in which he also served as Deputy Prime Minister, in 1993 following the Tamil case, outgoing prime minister Poul Schlüter attempted to have Ellemann-Jensen appointed acting prime minister until Henning Dyremose (Conservative) could take over, but the attempt was dropped as royal cabinet secretary Niels Eilschou Holm considered the maneuver unconstitutional. Instead, Poul Nyrup Rasmussen (Social Democrats) was appointed prime minister following a "Queen's round", and Ellemann-Jensen became leader of the opposition.

Ellemann-Jensen was leader of the opposition until the 1998 general election, which he lost with a single seat. If his party had only 85 more votes, he would have been able to form a new centre-right government as Prime Minister. He decided then to leave politics and his successor as the leader of Venstre was Anders Fogh Rasmussen, who became Prime Minister of Denmark in 2001.

The new active Danish foreign policy continued after Ellemann-Jensen's ten-year term as Foreign Minister and ultimately became a turning point in Danish foreign and defence policy. It later became known as the Ellemann-Jensen doctrine.

In 1995, Ellemann-Jensen was a candidate for the post of Secretary-General of NATO when Willy Claes was forced to leave the role. He got the support of the U.S. government, but France blocked his candidature, preferring the Spanish candidate, Javier Solana. Ellemann-Jensen never tried to hide his disappointment with not getting the post that he had wanted all his political life.

He participated eight times in the Bilderberg conferences: 1984, 1987 and every year between 1993 and 1998.

After leaving politics, Ellemann-Jensen became a columnist for the Danish daily Berlingske Tidende and a contributor to Project Syndicate.

Ellemann-Jensen became a central figure in the controversy following the Danish daily Jyllands-Posten's decision to print 12 satirical images of the Islamic prophet Muhammad in September 2005. In his column, only days after the cartoons were printed, he argued that he thought the cartoons represented an "unnecessary provocation", believing they constituted in themselves a caricature of Denmark's "cherished freedom of expression". Ellemann-Jensen remained in that position all through the controversy at the same time never missing an opportunity to support the Danish Prime Minister's stance that the government could not and should not take punitive action against the newspaper.

Personal life 
Uffe Ellemann-Jensen was the son of   a member of the Folketing. In 1971, his first marriage was dissolved and he married . He had four children, among them Jakob Ellemann-Jensen and Karen Ellemann. He was an avid hunter and fly fisher.

Awards 
On 18 December 2002, Ellemann-Jensen was awarded the Grand Cross of the Order of Dannebrog.

On 12 February 2010, Ellemann-Jensen received the highest accolade of the Republic of Macedonia, the Order 8-September for his contribution to the strengthening of Danish-Macedonian relations and for promotion of Macedonia in its initial years of independence in the early 1990s.

Illnesses and death 
In 1989, Ellemann-Jensen underwent surgery for two spinal disc herniations in his neck, but broke two cervical vertebrae during the operation; subsequently, he wore a neck brace for half a year. He had a stent inserted in his heart and, following a blood clot, a pacemaker. He had another blood clot in an IC3 train to Aalborg in 2003, after which he stopped smoking. He furthermore had diabetes. He had a tumor that pressed against his spinal cord removed in 2019. In a 2021 interview with Ellemann-Jensen, it was reported that an "old cancer [...] was stirring again", and referring to his health problems, he stated that he was "a wandering example of medical science's progress".

In August 2021, the thenfully vaccinated Ellemann-Jensen was admitted to hospital with COVID-19 for three weeks; he was then in further treatment for two weeks. Ellemann-Jensen had a successful prostate cancer surgery at an apparently early stage of the disease in January 2011. Subsequently, however, the cancer flared up again, and on 13 June 2022 he was admitted to Rigshospitalet, where he died on 18 June at the age of 80.

Bibliography 
 De nye millionærer (The new millionaires), 1971
 Det afhængige samfund (The dependent society), 1972
 Hvad gør vi ved Gudenåen? (What should we do about Gudenåen), 1973
 Den truede velstand (The threatened wealth), 1974
 Økonomi (Economy), 1975
 Da Danmark igen sagde ja til det fælles (When Denmark once more said yes to the common), 1987
 Et lille land, og dog (A small country, or perhaps not), 1991
 Olfert Fischer i Golfen (Olfert Fischer in the Gulf), 1991, with Sv. E. Thiede
 Din egen dag er kort (Your own day is short), 1996
 Rent ud sagt – indfald og udfald (Plainly spoken – ideas and attacks), 1997
 Sådan set (In a manner of speaking), 1997 with Erik Werner
 EU – derfor (EU – the reason), 1998
 Ude med snøren (Having the fishing line out), 2001
 Østen for solen (East of the sun), 2002
 FODfejl (Stepping in it), 2004
 Ude med snøren – fisk og mennesker jeg har mødt, 2004, autobiography featuring recreational fishing
 Vejen, jeg valgte, 2009, 
 Nu gik det lige så godt, men så gik verden af lave, 2009, about the effects of the financial crisis of 2007–2008

References 
Comments

Citations

Literature

External links 

 CV of Chairman Uffe Ellemann-Jensen at the website of Baltic Development Forum
 Commentary by Uffe Ellemann-Jensen at the website of Project Syndicate

1941 births
2022 deaths
Foreign ministers of Denmark
Members of the Folketing
People from Assens Municipality
Venstre (Denmark) politicians
Leaders of Venstre (Denmark)
Recipients of the Order of the Cross of Terra Mariana, 1st Class
Grand Crosses of the Order of the Dannebrog
Recipients of Nersornaat
Commanders Grand Cross of the Order of the Polar Star
Grand Crosses of the Order of the Lithuanian Grand Duke Gediminas
Grand Crosses of the Order of Merit of the Republic of Poland
Knights Grand Cross of the Order of Orange-Nassau
Grand Crosses of the Order of Prince Henry
Order of Duke Trpimir recipients
Knights Grand Cross of the Order of Isabella the Catholic